Phoenix Sky Harbor International Airport  is a civil–military public airport  east of downtown Phoenix, in Maricopa County, Arizona, United States. It is Arizona's largest and busiest airport, and among the largest commercial airports in the United States; in 2021, PHX was the 8th-busiest airport in the United States and 11th-busiest in the world. The airport serves as a hub for American Airlines and a base for Southwest Airlines. American (including American Eagle operated by Skywest and Mesa) serve more passengers from PHX than any other carrier .

The airport is also home to the 161st Air Refueling Wing (161 ARW), an Air Mobility Command (AMC)–gained unit of the Arizona Air National Guard. The military enclave is known as the Goldwater Air National Guard Base. One of two flying units in the Arizona ANG, the 161 ARW currently flies the KC-135R Stratotanker aircraft. In addition to its domestic role as a National Guard unit, answering to the Governor of Arizona, the 161 ARW also performs both a stateside and overseas role as a USAF organization, supporting air refueling and air mobility missions worldwide.

History

Sky Harbor Airport's evocative name was conceived by J. Parker Van Zandt, the owner of Scenic Airways, in 1928. However, the reasoning for the name is apparently unknown. Sky Harbor was built in late 1928 through early 1929 initially with one runway and was the fourth airport built in Phoenix. Scenic Airways, lacking funds after the infamous Stock Market Crash of 1929, sold the airport to Acme Investment Company, which owned the airport until 1935, when the city of Phoenix purchased Sky Harbor airport from Acme for $100,000.

On February 23, 1929, Maddux Air Lines began the airport's first scheduled passenger service with a route between San Francisco and El Paso stopping in Phoenix, Los Angeles, and several other cities; however the service was short lived, ending by autumn 1929. Standard Air Lines had been serving Phoenix since late 1927 at a different airport and began landing at Sky Harbor on August 5, 1929. Standard operated a route between Los Angeles and El Paso stopping at Phoenix, Tucson, and Douglas, Arizona. Standard was acquired by American Airways in 1930 which later became American Airlines. American extended the route eastward to New York by way of Dallas, Nashville, and many other cities making for a southern transcontinental route across the United States.
 
TWA began service to San Francisco in 1938 and added Phoenix onto its transcontinental network by 1944 with flights to Los Angeles and eastward to New York stopping at Albuquerque, Kansas City, and many more cities. 
Arizona Airways began intrastate service within Arizona in 1946 and merged into Frontier Airlines in 1950 which added new routes to Denver, Albuquerque, and El Paso. 
Bonanza Airlines began service by 1951 with a route to Las Vegas and Reno making several stops at smaller communities. New routes to Salt Lake City and Southern California were added in the 1960s along with nonstop flights to Las Vegas and Reno aboard Douglas DC-9 jets by 1965. Bonanza merged with two other carriers to become Air West in 1968 and was changed to Hughes Airwest in 1970 adding several new routes, including service to Mexico, creating a hub at Phoenix. Hughes Airwest was then merged into Republic Airlines in 1980 which continued the Phoenix hub operation until the mid-1980s. 
Western Airlines came to Sky Harbor in 1957 with flights to Denver, Los Angeles and San Diego, Continental Airlines came in 1961 to El Paso, Los Angeles, and Tucson, and Delta Air Lines began flights to Dallas by 1969. Since airline deregulation in 1978, Phoenix has seen numerous new air carriers begin service including United Airlines in 1980 and Southwest Airlines in 1982.

After World War II the airport began work on a new passenger terminal, as well as a new parallel runway and a diagonal runway.

The $835,000 Terminal 1 (originally called the "West Wing") which also had the first control tower, opened in October 1952. It was torn down in 1991 and replaced by a cell phone waiting lot, with Terminal 1's parking lot now being the West Economy lot.

The April 1957 OAG shows 42 scheduled airline departures a day: 16 American, 11 TWA, 10 Bonanza, and 5 Frontier. American began a nonstop DC-7 to New York (Idlewild) in the summer of 1959. Western Airlines began service in 1958 followed by Continental Airlines in 1961. Delta Air Lines began service in 1969 and was merged with Western in 1987, keeping the Delta brand.

The airport's master plan was redesigned in 1959 to eliminate the cross runway to make room for new terminals. American and TWA began jet service to Phoenix in 1960 and 1961 respectively, and Terminal 2 (originally called the "East Wing") opened in 1962. Terminal 2 was designed by the Phoenix architectural firms of Weaver & Drover and Lescher & Mahoney and opened in 1962. The Phoenix, designed by the late French-American artist and full-time resident of Phoenix Paul Coze, was commissioned in 1960 as Phoenix's first work of public art and was installed in 1962 in the main lobby area of the terminal. The Phoenix was installed in the Rental Car Center in 2021. In November 2006, a Military and Veterans Hospitality Room, sponsored by the Phoenix Military and Veterans Commission, was opened in Terminal 2. It has since relocated to Terminal 4 as the new USO. This terminal underwent two renovation projects. The first was completed in 1988. The second project, which cost $24 million and was designed by DWL Architects + Planners, Inc., was completed in 2007.

Designed by DWL Architects + Planners, Inc., construction on Terminal 3 began in January 1977. Terminal 3 opened in October 1979, and the "East" and "West" names were dropped since there were no longer only two terminals.

Bonanza Air Lines moved its headquarters from Las Vegas to Phoenix in 1966. Bonanza merged with two other airlines to form Air West, which became Hughes Airwest after Howard Hughes bought it in 1970. After airline deregulation in 1978 former Hughes Airwest executive Ed Beauvais formed a plan for a new airline based in Phoenix. He founded America West Airlines in 1981, which began service from Phoenix in 1983 and doubled in size during its first year. By the end of the decade America West was serving over 80 cities in the United States, Canada, and Mexico and was lobbying for transpacific service. In late 1992 America West contracted with Mesa Airlines to create a new feeder network called America West Express which served many smaller communities in Arizona, California, Colorado, and New Mexico.

After the Airline Deregulation Act was signed in 1978, many new airlines began service. Eastern Airlines and Allegheny Airlines soon began service in 1979 followed by United Airlines in 1980. Allegheny changed its name to USAir shortly after beginning service in 1979.

Southwest Airlines arrived at Phoenix in January 1982 with 13 daily flights to 12 cities; by 1986 it had 64 daily flights from Phoenix and had a crew base there. Southwest opened a maintenance facility at PHX in 1992, which was its largest.

In October 1989 ground was broken for Terminal 4, the largest terminal. It opened on November 2, 1990, with four concourses: N2 and N3 on the north side and S3 and S4 on the south side. In 1994 the N4 International Concourse was opened, adding 10 gates and a sterile walkway to the S4 concourse. In 1997 construction began on the 14-gate N1 concourse for America West Airlines. It was completed in June 1998 at a cost of $50 million, completing the expansion of the north side of the terminal. On the south side of the terminal, construction began in 2002 on the eight-gate S2 concourse for Southwest Airlines. This project was completed in 2004 and has a different architectural design from the other six concourses. The eighth and final concourse for Terminal 4 began construction in May 2019. Terminal 4 is named after former Arizona Senator and 1964 Presidential candidate Barry M. Goldwater. After Goldwater's death in 1998, the then-mayor of Phoenix, Skip Rimsza, proposed renaming the airport in Goldwater's memory but was deluged with public support for the familiar "Sky Harbor" name. Terminal 4, designed by DWL Architects + Planners, Inc., is the largest and busiest of the three terminals with 86 gates, divided into seven satellite concourses connected behind security.

America West filed for Chapter 11 bankruptcy protection in 1991 and sold its larger aircraft and Japanese route authority, but continued growing its domestic operations from Terminal 4 in cooperation with Continental Airlines. Although AWA enjoyed further growth at Phoenix during the 1990s the aftermath of the September 11, 2001 attacks strained its financial position. AWA ended its relationship with Continental and merged with US Airways in 2005. US Airways moved its headquarters to the AWA campus in Tempe and retained many AWA managers to run the merged company. US Airways was then merged into American Airlines in 2015 which continues to build upon the largest hub operation at Phoenix Sky Harbor.

Sky Harbor landed its first transatlantic flights in 1996 when British Airways inaugurated nonstop service to London. The flight was first operated with a Douglas DC-10 aircraft but soon upgraded to a Boeing 747-400.

In 2007 the Transportation Security Administration introduced the first of its backscatter X-ray machines at PHX.

Sky Harbor's private airplane area is also one of eight service centers for the Medevac airline Air Evac.

From 1951 through the end of 2022, over 1.376 billion passengers (domestic and international, enplaned and deplaned) have transited through PHX, an annual average of over 19.1 million passengers. In the same time frame there were over 29 million aircraft movements (commercial, military, general aviation) at PHX, an annual average of over 404,000 movements. PHX has grown over the years into a major US hub, and in 2020 was ranked the 24th-busiest airport in the world and eighth-busiest airport in the United States in passenger boardings.

In its 2019 airport rankings, The Wall Street Journal ranked Sky Harbor as the best airport overall among the 20 largest airports in the U.S. "Phoenix excelled in several of the 15 categories, with short screening waits, fast Wi-Fi, good Yelp scores for restaurant reviews, short taxi-to-takeoff times for planes and cheap average Uber cost to get downtown."

Facilities

Terminals
The airport has 117 active aircraft gates in two Terminals (3 and 4). The airport administration states that the designations Terminal 1 and Terminal 2 have been "retired" and that it did not wish to renumber the other terminals since passengers were already familiar with the numbers in place. Terminals 3 and 4 continue to retain their current numbers after the closing of Terminal 2. Bus gates are planned to be operated on the Terminal 2 site. American and Southwest use Terminal 4. The other airlines use Terminal 3. All international arrivals without border pre-clearance are processed in Terminal 4.

Terminal 3 contains 25 gates.
Terminal 4 contains 92 gates.

Runways
The airport has three parallel concrete/grooved runways:
 Runway 8/26 measuring 
 Runway 7L/25R measuring 
 Runway 7R/25L measuring 

ATC tower
The airport's current  air traffic control tower began operations on January 14, 2007. It stands just east of the Terminal 3 parking garage, and also houses the Phoenix TRACON. This is Sky Harbor's fourth control tower and is among the tallest control towers in North America.

Airlines and destinations

Passenger

The following airlines operate regularly scheduled passenger flights at Sky Harbor Airport:

Cargo

Statistics

Top destinations

Annual traffic

Airline market share

Ground transportation

Travelers can access both terminals from the East Economy Parking by using the PHX Sky Train. There is also terminal parking adjacent to each terminal. The airport continues to provide shuttle bus service between the terminals and the rental car center with separate routes serving each terminal until the PHX Sky Train project is complete.

Valley Metro bus route 13 has a stop near the Airport's Operations building, west of Terminal 3. Travelers connecting to or from the Greyhound station can use the Valley Metro route 13 bus. The Valley Metro Rail has a stop at the nearby 44th St/Washington light rail station. A moving sidewalk bridge over Washington Street allows light rail passengers to arrive at the nearby PHX Sky Train station and then onward to stations at the East Economy Parking Lot and Terminal 3 and 4. Valley Metro bus routes 44 serve the PHX Sky Train station at 44th Street and Washington.

A number of taxi, limousine, ride share and shuttle companies provide service between each airport terminal, the Phoenix metropolitan area, and other communities throughout the state.

By road, the airport terminals are served by East Sky Harbor Boulevard, which is fed by Interstate 10, Arizona State Routes 143 and 202.

PHX Sky Train

The PHX Sky Train is an automated people-mover, much like those found at other airports, that transports Sky Harbor passengers from the 44th Street and Washington Light Rail station to Sky Harbor's East Economy Parking lot, through both terminals. Phase 1 opened on April 8, 2013, and runs from the 44th Street and Washington Light Rail station, to East Economy Parking and on to Terminal 4. Phase 1A shuttles passengers to Terminal 3. Phase 1A opened on December 8, 2014. Phase 2 will transport passengers to the Rental Car Center. Phase 2 opened on December 20, 2022.

Accidents and incidents

See also

 Phoenix–Mesa Gateway Airport
 List of airports in Arizona
 List of tallest air traffic control towers in the United States

References

External links

 www.skyharbor.com, official site
 Phoenix Sky Harbor International Airport (PHX) at Arizona DOT airport directory
 Sky Harbor Airport Parking
 
 
 

 
Transportation buildings and structures in Phoenix, Arizona
Airports in Maricopa County, Arizona
Airports established in 1928
Aviation in Arizona
1928 establishments in Arizona